Frederick Lorz (June 5, 1884 – February 4, 1914) was an American long distance runner who won the 1905 Boston Marathon. Lorz is also known for his "finish" in the marathon at the 1904 Summer Olympics for not having crossed the "half-way mark" and still winning.

Biography
Born in New York City, Lorz was reported to have done all his training at night due to his profession as a bricklayer.

An announcement in the August 6, 1904 issue of The New York Times indicated that the Metropolitan Association of the Amateur Athletic Union would hold a "special seven-mile race" at Celtic Park on August 13, 1904 with the eight top finishers receiving a paid trip to compete in the marathon at the Olympic Games in St. Louis on August 30, 1904. Lorz, listed as representing the Mohawk Athletic Club, was named as one of 19 "probable competitors" in the event.

In the marathon at the 1904 Olympic Games, Lorz stopped running because of exhaustion after nine miles (14.5 km). His manager gave him a lift in his car and drove the next eleven miles (17.7 km), after which, Lorz continued on foot back to the Olympic stadium, where he broke the finishing line tape and was greeted as the winner of the race.

After spectators claimed he had not run the entire race, Lorz was confronted by furious officials with these allegations, upon which he admitted his deception:  despite his claims he was joking, the AAU responded by banning him for life, but he was reinstated after a year after it was found that he had not intended to defraud. Lodz then legitimately won the Boston Marathon in 1905 with a time of 2:38:25. Thomas Hicks went on to become the real winner of the 1904 race, though he too had an unusual race, walking part of the route, being carried by his trainers, and being dosed with strychnine, which has since been banned; among the 32 runners that started, he was one of several who came near death (along with William Garcia), and he retired the next day.

Lorz was suspended a second time by the Amateur Athletic Union for participating in an unsanctioned meet at the games of the Thomas Jefferson Club at Witzel's Grove, College Point, Long Island, New York on August 23, 1905. His application for reinstatement was denied; he was originally required to wait two years before applying for reinstatement, but he was reinstated in time to run the 1906 Chicago Marathon, where he finished fourth. He finished second at the Yonkers Marathon in 1907, seventh at the Boston Marathon in 1908, sixth at the Empire City Marathon in Yonkers in 1909, and second in another marathon in Boston nine days later.

In 1910 he married Dorothy Reilly, and they had three children. Lorz died in 1914 of pneumonia.

See also
Marathon course-cutting
List of winners of the Boston Marathon

References

External links

1884 births
1914 deaths
American male long-distance runners
American male marathon runners
Athletes (track and field) at the 1904 Summer Olympics
Boston Marathon male winners
Olympic track and field athletes of the United States
Cheating in sports
Sports controversies
Banned sportspeople
Deaths from pneumonia in New York (state)
Track and field athletes from New York City
American bricklayers